The QSDK is a streaming scene graph retained-mode Application Programming Interface (API) combined with a cell-portal system to connect scene graphs. Audio and animation are fully supported.

It is available on Macintosh, PlayStation 2 and Xbox platforms, and for free on PC platforms.

External links
Qube Software
Q Developer Network

3D scenegraph APIs